In signal processing, a Constant Amplitude Zero AutoCorrelation waveform (CAZAC) is a periodic complex-valued signal with modulus one and out-of-phase periodic (cyclic) autocorrelations equal to zero.  CAZAC sequences find application in wireless communication systems, for example in 3GPP Long Term Evolution for synchronization of mobile phones with base stations. Zadoff–Chu sequences are well-known CAZAC sequences with special properties.

Example CAZAC Sequence 

For a CAZAC sequence of length  where  is relatively prime to  the th symbol  is given by:

Even N

Odd N

Power Spectrum of CAZAC Sequence

The power spectrum of a CAZAC sequence is flat.

If we have a CAZAC sequence the time domain autocorrelation is an impulse

 

The discrete fourier transform of the autocorrelation is flat

 

Power spectrum is related to autocorrelation by

 

As a result the power spectrum is also flat.

References

External links
 CAZAC Sequence Generator (Java applet)

Signal processing